Corstorphine Hospital was a community hospital on Corstorphine Road, Corstorphine in Edinburgh, Scotland. It was managed by NHS Lothian.

History
The hospital was designed by Peddie and Kinnear and opened as the Edinburgh Royal Infirmary Convalescent Home in July 1867. It was extended in the 1890s and joined the National Health Service in 1948.

In 2014, the health board considered proposals to demolish the hospital and three others, with a view to replacing these facilities with care villages which would consist of buildings more suited to social care. The hospital closed that year, although the specialist nursing home on the site remained open.

Services
The hospital specialised in long term and respite care for elderly people who had experienced a stroke or those with dementia.

References 

Hospitals in Edinburgh
NHS Lothian
Defunct hospitals in Scotland